Up Popped the Devil is an album by American jazz pianist Mal Waldron recorded in 1973 and released by the Enja label.

Reception
The AllMusic review by Bob Rusch awarded the album 4½ stars stating "Pianist Mal Waldron's music is characterized by a heavily-brooding rhythmic quality, with the left hand usually carrying the theme at one repetitious tempo while the right hammers away in juxtaposition with a counter tempo (usually faster)".

Track listing
All compositions by Mal Waldron
 "Up Popped the Devil" – 10:25 
 "Space Walk" – 12:28 
 "Snake Out" – 11:02 
 "Changachangachanga" – 13:32 
Recorded at Studio WARP in New York City on December 28, 1973.

Personnel 
 Mal Waldron – piano 
 Carla Poole – flute  (track 2)   
 Reggie Workman – bass 
 Billy Higgins – drums

References 

Enja Records albums
Mal Waldron albums
1974 albums